Agostino Quinzio, O.P. (died 1611) was a Roman Catholic prelate who served as Bishop of Massa Lubrense (1605–1611) and Bishop of Korčula (1573–1605).

Biography
Agostino Quinzio was ordained a priest in the Order of Preachers.
On 17 June 1573, he was appointed by Pope Gregory XIII as Bishop of Korčula. 
On 17 August 1605, he was appointed by Pope Paul V as Bishop of Massa Lubrense. 
He served as Bishop of Massa Lubrense until his death in 1611.

Episcopal succession
While bishop, he served as the co-consecrator of:

References

External links and additional sources
 (for Chronology of Bishops) 
 (for Chronology of Bishops) 
 (for Chronology of Bishops) 
 (for Chronology of Bishops) 

1611 deaths
17th-century Italian Roman Catholic bishops
Bishops appointed by Pope Gregory XIII
Bishops appointed by Pope Paul V
Dominican bishops
17th-century Roman Catholic bishops in Croatia